Parablacinae is a subfamily of click beetles in the family Elateridae. There are about eight genera in Parablacinae.

Genera
These eight genera belong to the subfamily Parablacinae:
 Metablax Candèze, 1869
 Ophidius Candèze, 1863
 Parablax Schwarz, 1906
 Parasaphes Candèze, 1882
 Sharon (beetle) Arias-Bohart & Elgueta, 2015
 Tasmanelater Calder, 1996
 Wynarka (beetle) Calder, 1986
 Xuthelater Calder, 1996

References

Further reading

 

Elateridae
Taxa described in 2016